Golden Delicious is Mike Doughty's second studio album. The album was released on February 19, 2008.

Track listing 

"Fort Hood"
"I Just Want the Girl in the Blue Dress to Keep On Dancing"
"Put It Down"
"More Bacon Than the Pan Can Handle"
"27 Jennifers"
"I Wrote a Song About Your Car"
"I Got the Drop on You"
"Wednesday (No Se Apoye)"
"Like a Luminous Girl"
"Nectarine (Part One)"
"Navigating by the Stars at Night"
"Book of Love" [iTunes Only (Magnetic Fields cover)]

Busking EP
Select versions of the album included the Busking EP, which included 5 songs from the limited album "Busking", which had 12 tracks total.

"Looking at the World From the Bottom of a Well"
"F Train"
"The Only Answer"
"40 Grand"
"Sunkeneyed Girl"

References 

2008 albums
Mike Doughty albums
ATO Records albums
Albums produced by Dan Wilson (musician)